Hanna Honthy (born Hajnalka Hügel; 21 February 1893, Budapest – 30 December 1978, Budapest), was a Hungarian opera singer and actress.

Career
Hügel was born on 21 February 1893, in Budapest. From age 10, she was a ballet student at the Opera. She finished her training as a private student and learned acting with Szidi Rákos between 1914 and 1915, then from Ödön Bárdi between 1915 and 1917, and singing from renowned tenor Georg Anthes. After appearing as an actress in Pozsony, Fiume, and Szombathely by the name of Hanna Honthy, she returned to Budapest in 1920. In Budapest her first success came in the Blaha Lujza theatre. She appeared in numerous theaters during her career including the Vígszínház, Városi Színház, achieving fame as a 'prima donna'. Her critically acclaimed voice and acting talent bore fruit for many years. She was the member of the Fővárosi Operettszínház [Budapest Operetta] between 1925-1927 and 1949. She also appeared in film.

Filmography

Movies
 Budapesti hangos filmkabaré (1931)
 Régi nyár (1941)
 Déryné (1951)
 Díszelőadás (1955)
 Bástyasétány '74 (1974)

TV movies
 Csárdáskirálynő (1963)
 Nyolcvanéves Cecília

Gallery

Sources
 Gál Péter Molnár. Honthy Hanna és kora Budapest: Magvető, 1997. .
 Hanna Honthy in the Hungarian Biographical Lexicon freely available online at mek.niif.hu

External links

 
 

1893 births
1978 deaths
20th-century Hungarian women opera singers
Hungarian film actresses
Hungarian stage actresses
Actresses from Budapest
Burials at Farkasréti Cemetery